Curzerenone is an antimicrobial isolate of Lindera pulcherrima.

References

Sesquiterpenes
Furans